Jorge Leonel Sandoval Figueroa (born 12 March 1949) is a Mexican jurist and politician affiliated with the Institutional Revolutionary Party. From 1 September 2003 to 31 August 2006 he served as Deputy of the LIX Legislature of the Mexican Congress representing Jalisco.

References

1949 births
Living people
People from Guadalajara, Jalisco
Mexican jurists
Institutional Revolutionary Party politicians
Members of the Congress of Jalisco
20th-century Mexican politicians
21st-century Mexican politicians
Deputies of the LIX Legislature of Mexico
Members of the Chamber of Deputies (Mexico) for Jalisco